Nomi is a comune (municipality) in Trentino in the northern Italian region Trentino-Alto Adige/Südtirol, located about  south of Trento.

Nomi borders the following municipalities: Aldeno, Besenello, Calliano, Pomarolo and Volano.

Demographic evolution

References

External links
 Homepage of the city

Cities and towns in Trentino-Alto Adige/Südtirol